Galumnidae is a family of mites and ticks in the order Sarcoptiformes. There are at least 30 genera and 410 described species in Galumnidae.

Genera

References

Further reading

 
 
 
 

Sarcoptiformes
Acari families